Richard H. Jefferson (January 20, 1931 – June 28, 2021) was an American politician who served in the Minnesota House of Representatives from 1987 to 1999. Jefferson graduated from Xavier University of Louisiana and was a chemist. He lived in Minneapolis, Minnesota when he was elected to the Minnesota Legislature. His nickname was "Jeff."

He died on June 28, 2021, in Cedar, Minnesota at age 90.

References

1931 births
2021 deaths
Politicians from Cincinnati
Politicians from Minneapolis
Xavier University of Louisiana alumni
American chemists
Democratic Party members of the Minnesota House of Representatives